Section 127 of the Constitution of Australia was the final section within Chapter VII (dealing with miscellaneous matters) of the Australian Constitution, and excluded Indigenous Australians from population counts for constitutional purposes. It came into effect on 1 January 1901 when the founding states federated into the Commonwealth of Australia, and was repealed effective 10 August 1967 following the 1967 referendum.

Text 
Section 127 was included in the Constitution of Australia when it was ratified, and stated that:

In reckoning the numbers of the people of the Commonwealth, or of a State or other part of the Commonwealth, aboriginal natives shall not be counted.

The interpretation of section 127 depends on the language used in other parts of the Constitution. Section 24 mandates that each state is entitled to members in the House of Representatives based on a population quota determined from the "latest statistics of the Commonwealth."  These statistics arise from the census conducted under the auspices of section 51(xi). The purpose of section 127 was to prevent the inclusion of Aboriginal people in section 24 determinations, and thus to prevent the Indigenous populace from influencing the determination of electoral boundaries by the Australian Electoral Commission.  Including Indigenous people in these calculations would alter the distribution of seats between the states to the benefit of states with larger Aboriginal populations (though not to the benefit of the Aboriginal people).  Concerns were expressed at the 1897–98 Federation Convention about the distribution of seats and also the possibility of states receiving reduced monies from Commonwealth grants if section 127 were not included.

The language of section 127 does not include the words statistic or census, and consequently the Commonwealth had the power to collect data on the Aboriginal populace, though what was collected lacked quality and comprehensiveness.  Its purpose was not to deny information to the government but to give effect to a belief that the indigenous peoples of Australia were separate from the colonists joining together to form a nation.  From the arrival of the First Fleet, the Aboriginal peoples were considered British subjects but not citizens, and when Federation occurred, the "Australian governments and the people had no use for the Aborigines."  Consideration of the indigenous population was limited to the "problem" of the potential for their number to influence the composition of the House of Representatives, and that was "solved" with section 127.  Actual responsibility for the Aboriginal people was left to the individual states (explaining their exclusion from race power); this contributed to the mistaken belief that Aboriginal Australians were considered as 'flora and fauna' until the 1967 referendum on the status of Aboriginals, which was originally the metaphor of pioneer Aboriginal filmmaker Lester Bostock to describe the status of Indigenous Australians, not a statement of fact. Constitutional scholar George Williams has described the race power and section 127 as part of the racism in Australia's constitutional DNA. In the 1960s in the lead-up to the repeal of section 127, racist attitudes towards Aborigines were openly expressed.  For example, the Sydney Morning Herald characterised the idea of trying to count the indigenous population as part of the census as both "a mildly entertaining historical oddity" and as "more difficult than rounding up a mob of wild brumbies".

Repeal 

The Holt Government held two constitutional referendums on 27 May 1967, and amendments relating to Indigenous Australians were carried overwhelmingly with 90.8% of votes cast in favour.  Technically, the referendum passed the bill titled the Constitution Alteration (Aboriginals) 1967 and it became law on 10 August 1967.  The referendum was intended to alter section 51(xxvi) to allow the Federal Parliament to legislate in states for the benefit of the Aboriginal people (they were already so-empowered in the territories by section 122), though the High Court decision in Kartinyeri v Commonwealth has since clarified that legislating to the detriment of Aborigines was also authorised.  Section 127 was repealed in its entirety, having the immediate effect of including Aboriginal Australians in determinations of population, and Indigenous Australians have been fully included in the census since 1971 (the first census conducted after the passage of the referendum).

The other question put in the referendum, to allow the number of seats in the House of Representatives to be increased without increasing the number of senators, was rejected.  Other racially discriminatory parts of the Constitution were left in place.

Consequences 
One immediate consequence of the repeal of section 127 was that full inclusion of Indigenous people in the census became mandatory and the Aboriginal populace was reflected in the allocation of seats in the House of Representatives between the states.  Collection of sound and systematic data by the Australian Bureau of Statistics (ABS) replaced the previous inadequate data collections.  The availability of these demographic data following the 1971 census enabled the systematic determination and monitoring of key health indicators such as infant mortality rates and life expectancy.  Aboriginal life expectancy remains significantly lower than the average population, though the situation has been improving.  ABS data from the early 1990s showed life expectancy at birth for Indigenous men to be 18 years shorter than for their non-Indigenous counterparts, and 17 years shorter for women.  By 2010–2012, the life expectancy at birth for Aboriginal and Torres Strait Islanders has risen to 69.1 years for males and 73.7 years for females, which still lagged around 10 years behind the expectancies for the non-Indigenous population. Infant mortality rates in the early 1970s were among the highest in the world. Substantial improvements had occurred by the early 1990s but Aboriginal health indicators still lag behind those of the total population, especially for those living in remote areas, and closing the gap policies remain an ongoing part of governance in Australia.

Other constitutional treatment of Aboriginals 
The right to vote may be limited under section 25 on racial grounds as anyone disqualified from voting on racial grounds at a State level was automatically excluded at the Federal level.  It was intended as a penalty against any state which excluded voters on the basis of race as it would consequently have its federal representation reduced.  However, as George Williams has argued, it recognises that race-based disqualification is possible, which is antithetical to true equality between Indigenous and non-Indigenous Australians.  The removal of this section is one of the changes needed to prevent lawful race-based discrimination against the Aboriginal peoples, and is one of the recommendations of the Expert Panel on Recognising Aboriginal and Torres Strait Islander Peoples in the Constitution.  They also recommended deletion of the race power (section 51(xxvi)) and the addition of new provisions prohibiting any race-based discrimination, suggestions that have found support in the legal fraternity.

Other sources

See also

Three-Fifths Compromise, similar clause in U.S. Constitution that limited total count of slaves in censuses to 60% of total for purposes of allocating seats in Congress.

References

Australian Bureau of Statistics
Australian constitutional law
Demographics of Australia
Race and law